Aua is an island in the Bismarck Archipelago. It is part of the Western Islands, region and Manus Province of northern Papua New Guinea.

History
The first sighting by Europeans of Aua island was by the Spanish navigator Iñigo Órtiz de Retes on 27 July 1545 when on board of the carrack San Juan tried to return from Tidore to New Spain. He charted this island together with the nearby islands, Wuvulu and Manu, as La Barbada (the bearded island in Spanish).

See also

References

Bismarck Archipelago
Manus Province
Islands of Papua New Guinea
Islands Region (Papua New Guinea)
Spanish East Indies